The 43rd Filmfare Awards South ceremony honoring the winners and nominees of the best of South Indian cinema films released 1995, is an event that was held in Madras 14 September 1996 & the awards were distributed at Kamaraj Hall.

Main awards

Kannada cinema

Malayalam cinema

Tamil cinema

Telugu cinema

Special awards

References

External links
 
 
 https://web.archive.org/web/19991010171143/http://www.filmfare.com/site/nov96/faward.htm

Filmfare Awards South